Gyöngyi Bardi-Gerevich (born 2 February 1958) is a Hungarian volleyball player. She competed at the 1976 Summer Olympics and the 1980 Summer Olympics.

References

External links
 

1958 births
Living people
Hungarian women's volleyball players
Olympic volleyball players of Hungary
Volleyball players at the 1976 Summer Olympics
Volleyball players at the 1980 Summer Olympics
Sportspeople from Hajdú-Bihar County